Feeder fish is the common name for certain types of small, inexpensive fish commonly fed as live food to other captive animals such as predatory fishes (e.g. aquarium sharks, farmed salmon and tuna) or carnivorous aquarium fish (e.g. oscars, gar, grouper and rays), turtles, crocodilians and other piscivores that naturally hunt in fresh, brackish or salt water ecosystems (zoo animals such as grizzlies, water snakes, cetaceans, pinnipeds and penguins).

Advantages of using feeder fish 
The species of fish usually sold as feeder fish are invariably some of the easiest fish for fishkeepers to rear and breed, such as common goldfish, guppies and fathead minnow. Typically, these species are tolerant of overcrowding and have a high fecundity and rapid growth rate. This makes it easy for fish farmers, retailers, and hobbyists to maintain large populations of these fish that can be sold at a much more affordable price than the more ornamental fish that require better conditions.

In some cases, species of predatory animals, typically large fish such as catfish and cichlids, but sometimes also animals such as freshwater turtles, are provided with feeder fish, because they accept them more readily than alternatives. Other animal keepers believe that feeder fish are particularly nutritious, being what one would expect their pets would eat in the wild; some others view feeder fish as a stimulating treat that encourages predatory animals to exercise their natural hunting behaviours. Some animal keepers enjoy watching the hunting and eating techniques involved when predation occurs.

Disadvantages of using feeder fish 
Some aquarists view the use of feeder fish as cruel and unnecessary, often arguing that once the feeder fish is introduced into a small tank, it has no chance to escape, and such a situation cannot be considered "natural". Most predatory species that eat live fish can also be weaned onto dead alternatives. Some of the species used as feeder fish (goldfish and rosy red minnows) contain high quantities of thiaminase, an enzyme that destroys thiamine (vitamin B1) and when fed in large quantities can cause nutritional imbalances. When bred and held in an overcrowded or otherwise sub-optimal environment, they may also carry bacterial infections and parasites, which can be passed along to fish that consume them. A disadvantage of using feeder fish, particularly goldfish, is that they do not accurately simulate what a tropical fish might eat in the wild.

Species use
Several fast-growing and hardy species are commonly sold and used as feeder fish. Depending on the locality, feeder fish may include:　
 Low-quality, common livebearers, usually guppies, mosquito fish and platies
 Small cyprinids, particularly rosy red minnows and goldfish
 Undesirable livebearer and cichlid fry
 Female Siamese fighting fish
 Young tilapia
 Defective fry

Opinions within the hobby 
Although the use of feeder fish is fairly common in the United States, in the United Kingdom it is much less commonplace, with aquarists and hobby magazines in Britain generally rejecting the use of feeder fish as being unnecessary and likely to cause health problems.

See also 
Aquarium fish feeder
Forage fish
Bait fish

References

External links
 Feeder Fish Mini-FAQ, the pros and cons — Review of the merits and problems of using feeder fish
 The Use of Live Feeder Fish in Saltwater Aquariums, by Tristan Gordon 

Fishkeeping